Gesamtausgabe (German for collected works) may refer to: 

 Beethoven Gesamtausgabe, the first collected edition (1862-1888) of the works of Ludwig van Beethoven
 Bruckner Gesamtausgabe, the critical edition of the works of Anton Bruckner
 Nicolaus Copernicus Gesamtausgabe , the comprehensive, commented collection of works by, about, and related to Nicolaus Copernicus
 Heidegger Gesamtausgabe, the collected works of Martin Heidegger
 Weimar edition of Martin Luther's works, the critical complete edition of all writings of Martin Luther and his verbal statements, in Latin and German
 Marx-Engels-Gesamtausgabe, the largest collection of the writing of Karl Marx and Friedrich Engels in any language
 Alte Mozart-Ausgabe, the first complete edition of the music of Wolfgang Amadeus Mozart
 Neue Mozart-Ausgabe, the second complete works edition of the music of Wolfgang Amadeus Mozart
 Franz Schubert's Works, a late 19th-century publication of Franz Schubert's compositions.
 Weber Gesamtausgabe, the collected works of Max Weber
 Carl-Maria-von-Weber-Gesamtausgabe, the scientific-critical edition of all works of the composer Carl Maria von Weber